Peter Hague Nye FRS (16 September 1921 – 13 February 2009) was a British soil scientist.

He was educated at Charterhouse School, Balliol College, Oxford and Christ's College, Cambridge.

He was a Lecturer in Soil Science at the University College of Ibadan, Nigeria from 1950 to 1952, and then a Senion Lecturer in Soil Science at the University of Ghana from 1952 to 1960. He was a Reader in Soil Science at the University of Oxford from 1961 to 1988 where he was a Fellow of St Cross College, Oxford. He was Elected a Fellow of the Royal Society in 1987. He delivered a Messenger Lecture at Cornell University in 1989.

References

1921 births
2009 deaths
People educated at Charterhouse School
Alumni of Balliol College, Oxford
Alumni of Christ's College, Cambridge
British soil scientists
Academic staff of the University of Ibadan
Academic staff of the University of Ghana
Fellows of St Cross College, Oxford
Fellows of the Royal Society
People from Hove
Place of birth missing
Place of death missing